Necati Ateş (born 3 January 1980) is a retired Turkish professional footballer who played as a forward.

Club career
Born in İzmir, Ateş made his professional debut with Altay S.K. and Adanaspor, scoring for both at an impressive rate. In 2004, he signed with Süper Lig giants Galatasaray SK.

In 2005–06, Ateş played an integral part in Galatasaray's 16th national championship conquest. However, on 25 July 2007, club manager Karl-Heinz Feldkamp officially reported to the board he was not planning to use the player in the upcoming season, which resulted in a transfer list; he split (always on loan) the campaign between Ankaraspor and Istanbul Büyükşehir Belediyespor, netting 11 goals in total.

For 2008–09 another loan ensued, as Ateş joined Real Sociedad. Though heavily featured, he only managed to score once and the Basque side finished sixth, thus failing to return to La Liga.

In the 2009 summer, after more than 100 official matches and over 50 goals, Galtasaray released Ateş. He immediately joined fellow league club Antalyaspor, ranking joint-fourth in the topscorers' list as it finished ninth.

On the last day of the January 2012 transfer window, Ateş signed a six-month contract with old acquaintance Galatasaray for a fee of €250,000. He scored his first goal in his second spell on 4 February in a 2–1 win at Gaziantepspor, and went on to have an important offensive role as the team won the domestic league.

International career
Ateş made his Turkey national team debut during the 2003 FIFA Confederations Cup, playing three times for the third-placed nation and going scoreless in the process. His first goal came on 26 March 2005, in a 2–0 home win against Albania for the 2006 FIFA World Cup qualifiers. He also netted in the turbulent playoff against Switzerland, in November.

International goals
Scores and results table. Turkey's goal tally first:

Career statistics

Club

International

Honours

Club
Galatasaray
Süper Lig: 2005–06, 2011–12
Turkish Cup: 2004–05
Turkish Super Cup: 2012

International
Turkey
FIFA Confederations Cup: Third-place 2003

References

External links

1980 births
Living people
Footballers from İzmir
Turkish footballers
Association football forwards
Süper Lig players
TFF First League players
Altay S.K. footballers
Adanaspor footballers
Galatasaray S.K. footballers
Ankaraspor footballers
İstanbul Başakşehir F.K. players
Antalyaspor footballers
Eskişehirspor footballers
Kayseri Erciyesspor footballers
Karşıyaka S.K. footballers
Segunda División players
Real Sociedad footballers
Turkey youth international footballers
Turkey under-21 international footballers
Turkey B international footballers
Turkey international footballers
2003 FIFA Confederations Cup players
Turkish expatriate footballers
Expatriate footballers in Spain
Turkish expatriate sportspeople in Spain
Galatasaray S.K. (football) non-playing staff